Codajás is a municipality located in the Brazilian state of Amazonas. Its population was 29,168 (2020) and its area is 18,712 km².

The municipality contains part of the Amanã Sustainable Development Reserve.

Climate

References

Municipalities in Amazonas (Brazilian state)
Populated places on the Amazon